Aksaz Naval Base is a base of the Turkish Navy on the south-east coast of the Aegean Sea in Marmaris, Muğla. Six helicopters are also stationed at Aksaz.

History 

To meet the requirements of the Turkish Navy's power presence in the Mediterranean and Aegean Sea, extensive planning was started in the late 1960s for the search of the location of a naval base. The place had been mentioned by Piri Reis in Ottoman historical documents as the most appropriate natural harbor capable of hosting a large naval fleet.

Construction of the naval base started in 1983. With the completion of the infrastructure in 1992, units and vessels of the navy started to move in. The base reached its final stage in 2000. Naval Base Aksaz is today a modern facility, preferred for logistic support also by foreign navies.

Operations 
At the Aksaz Naval Base, the Southern Sea Area Command of the Turkish Navy maintains special units as:
 Su Altı Savunma (SAS) (Underwater Defense)
 Su Altı Taaruz (SAT) (Underwater Attack)

References 

Turkish Navy bases
Economy of Muğla
Military in Muğla
Buildings and structures in Muğla Province
Marmaris